The Consiglio di Stato is a legal-administrative consultative body that ensures the legality of public administration in Italy. The council has jurisdiction on acts of all administrative authorities, except when these authorities lack discretionary power, in which case the dispute is considered to be one of civil law.

Authority 
The council derives its authority and powers from several articles in the Constitution of Italy.

Article 100:
 The Council of State is a legal-administrative consultative body and ensures the legality of public administration.

Article 103:
 The Council of State and the other organs of judicial administration have jurisdiction for safeguarding before the public administration legitimate rights and, in particular matters laid out by law, also subjective rights.

Article 111:
 Appeals to Cassation against decisions of the Council of State and the Court of Accounts are permitted only for motives arising from judicial flaws.

Consultative role
The council has consultative authority in several different cases defined by statute.

 Cases in which the consultation of the Council is compulsory (statute n°127 from May 15, 1997):
 drafts of regulations to be signed by a minister or by the President of the Republic;
 drafts of legislations or regulations unifying various previous texts;
 general models for certain types of contracts, agreements and conventions established by one or several ministers ;
 administrative decisions which are bound by the advice of the Council of State in the instances provided for by legislation previous to the statute n°127/1997;
 extraordinary petitions to the President of the Republic (petition in-lieu-of litigation sent by citizens to the President of the Republic as a fountain of justice, which are transmitted then to one of the administrative sections of the Council of State. The latter formulates an advice: if the competent minister feels disinclined to follow it, he has to refer the case to the cabinet which is alone may vote to disregard the council's opinion).
 Cases in which the Council may be consulted:
 bills and normative acts of the European Union;
 any question concerning the interpretation of statutes or good administration which a minister may wish to submit to the Council.

Structure 
The council has 111 members: the President, 18 presidents of section and 92 councillors of State:

 Two consultative sections, of which one on proposed new rules or regulations;
 Four judicial sections;
 Special (ad hoc) consultative commission;
 A consultative general assembly, composed of all the members of the Council of State;
 A plenary assembly of the judicial sections (13 members).

External links 
 Official site
 International Association of Supreme Administrative Jurisdictions webpage

Judiciary of Italy
Administrative courts
Institutions of constitutional importance of Italy
Courts and tribunals with year of establishment missing